Hilton in Columbus, Georgia was built in 1843 for Dr. Lovick Pierce, who bought the land in 1838.  It was built as a "comfortable" four-room house on its own city block, with a driveway avenue of cedar trees leading to it from Macon Road.

He was a medical doctor in Philadelphia and became a Methodist minister.

It was listed on the National Register of Historic Places in 1972. The NRHP listing included  with two contributing buildings.

Its architecture is described as "Italian Villa" style, which may relate to Italianate architecture.

The house was restored in 1936.

References

Houses on the National Register of Historic Places in Georgia (U.S. state)
Houses completed in 1843
Houses in Columbus, Georgia
Italianate architecture in Georgia (U.S. state)
1843 establishments in Georgia (U.S. state)
National Register of Historic Places in Muscogee County, Georgia